Keogh Barracks is a military installation on Mytchett Place Road, Mytchett, Surrey, England.

History
The barracks were commissioned to accommodate the Army School of Hygiene and are named after Sir Alfred Keogh, a former Director-General of Army Medical Services. The foundation stone for the main building was laid by Lieutenant General Sir James Hartigan, Director-General of Army Medical Services, in February 1938. The Museum of Military Medicine has its origins in the "Mytchett Collection", a collection of documents accumulated there since 1952. In 1954 the RAMC Field Training Centre took over administration of the barracks. The depot of the Royal Army Medical Corps arrived from Queen Elizabeth Barracks, Church Crookham in 1964 and the Field Training Centre subsequently became known as the Royal Army Medical Corps Training Centre.

By the 1990s the Royal Army Medical Corps Training Centre had changed its name to the Army Medical Services Training Group. The Army Medical Services Training Group amalgamated with the equivalent organizations in the Royal Navy and the Royal Air Force to form the Defence Medical Services Training Centre at Keogh Barracks in 1996. However it moved to Whittington Barracks as the Defence College of Healthcare Education and Training in 2014. A major refurbishment costing £50 million was carried out at Keogh Barracks in order to accommodate 4 Armoured Medical Regiment in 2015.

Current units
2nd Battalion, Ranger Regiment
22 Field Hospital, Royal Army Medical Corps

References

Barracks in England
Installations of the British Army